Trupanea bistigmosa is a species of tephritid or fruit flies in the genus Trupanea of the family Tephritidae.

Distribution
Peru, Chile.

References

Tephritinae
Insects described in 1941
Diptera of South America